Progomphus risi is a species of dragonfly in the family Gomphidae. It is found in Guatemala and Mexico. Its natural habitats are subtropical or tropical moist lowland forests and rivers. It is threatened by habitat loss.

References

Gomphidae
Taxonomy articles created by Polbot
Insects described in 1920